Ursula Rani Sarma is an Irish playwright and screenwriter.

Life 
Sarma grew up in County Clare, Ireland. Her father is of Indian descent, while her mother is Irish. She attended University College Cork for her undergraduate degree. She is now based in London.

Career 
She began directing and writing plays while a student at University College Cork. Sarma has contributed episodes to the television series RAW, and has been a writer in residence at Paines Plough.

Works 
 Like Sugar on Skin (1999)
 Touched (1999)
 Blue (2000)
 Wanderings (2000)
 Gift (2001)
 The Magic Tree (2008)
 The Dark Things (2009). Selected as Best New Play and Best Production at the 2010 Critics' Awards for Theatre in Scotland.
 A version of Lorca's Yerma (2011)
 Evening Train (2019). A musical, based on the album of the same name by Mick Flannery.
 A Thousand Splendid Suns. A play, based on the book by Khalid Hosseini.

Notes

Further reading

External links 
 

Alumni of University College Cork
Irish dramatists and playwrights
Irish people of Indian descent
Irish screenwriters
Living people
People from County Clare
Year of birth missing (living people)